Anne Elizabeth Moore is an American cultural critic, artist, award-winning journalist, and editor. She is well known for her books Sweet Little Cunt (2018), Gentrifier: A Memoir (2021), and Body Horror: Capitalism, Fear, Misogyny, Jokes (2023). Her work mainly deals with the nature of power and women’s oppression, the housing crisis and gentrification, and women’s health.

Moore’s writing has been featured in various publications, including the Guardian, Salon, Paris Review, Chicago Journal, and The Baffler. She has written extensively about culture and media, illness, and human rights. Her essays “Reimagining the National Border Patrol Museum (and Gift Shop)” (2008) and “17 Theses on the Edge” (2010) have respectively received honorable mentions in Best American Non-Required Reading.

Life and career 
Born 1971 in Winner, South Dakota, Moore graduated high school to attend the University of Wisconsin-Eau Claire and the School of the Art Institute of Chicago, where she got her start and trained as an artist to eventually exhibit work internationally. Her work has also been in the Whitney Biennial in New York and the Museum of Contemporary Art in Chicago. She also received various awards, including the National Endowment for the Arts Media Award, the Ragdale Fellowship, the USC Annenberg/Getty Arts Journalism Fellowship, the UN Press Fellowship for journalism, and two Fulbright Scholarships.

Moore was named editor-in-chief of the Chicago Reader in October 2018, replacing Mark Konkol.  She abruptly departed the Reader in March 2019.

Currently, she lives in Upstate New York with her cat, Captain America, writing, traveling, teaching, and dealing with the occasional cow and snake.

Nonfiction

Books 
 Unmarketable: Brandalism, Copyfighting, Mocketing, and the Erosion of Integrity. (2007)

 Hip Hop Apsara: Ghosts Past and Present (2012)

 New Girl Law: Drafting a Future for Cambodia (2013)

 Threadbare: Clothes, Sex, and Trafficking (2016)

 Body Horror: Capitalism, Fear, Misogyny, Jokes 1st ed. (2017)

 Sweet Little Cunt: The Graphic Work of Julie Doucet (2018)

 Gentrifier: A Memoir (2021)

 Body Horror: Capitalism, Fear, Misogyny, Jokes 2nd ed. (2023)

Selected Essays

Essays on American Culture 
 On Leaving the Birthplace of Standard Time, The Believer (an excerpt from Body Horror)

 Knocked Out Loaded, The New Inquiry

Comics, Books, Film & Art 
 The Destabilizing Desire of Julie Doucet, Paris Review (an excerpt from Sweet Little Cunt)

 The Never-ending Story, The Baffler

 Silenced without Proof: On Soft Censorship, PEN America

 Our Pol Pot: A Film from Cambodia, n+1

Media and Politics 
 The Vertically Integrated Rape Joke, The Baffler

Women & Labor 
 Here’s why it matters when a human rights crusader builds her advocacy on lies, Salon

 Degendering Value, Jacobin

Awards
 2019 Eisner Award for Best Academic/Scholarly Work for Sweet Little Cunt: The Graphic Work of Julie Doucet (Uncivilized Books)

References

External links
 
 Three Days in Detroit (2017)
 The Tupperware Party (2018)

American editors
Comics critics
Book artists
American contemporary artists
Webzine writers
American women essayists
American essayists
Living people
University of Wisconsin–Eau Claire alumni
School of the Art Institute of Chicago alumni
1971 births
American women illustrators
American illustrators
Women book artists
21st-century American women